SN 1939C was a supernova in the Fireworks Galaxy first discovered by Fritz Zwicky on 17 July 1939. With a right ascension of 20:34:23.0 and a declination of +60:09:37.3, it lies 215"W and 24"N away from the center of the Fireworks Galaxy. It peaked at a magnitude of 13.0.

References

External links
 Light curve on the Open Supernova Catalog

19390717
Supernovae
Cepheus (constellation)